Kleemann A/S is an after-market tuning company for Mercedes-Benz sports cars, sedans, and SUVs headquartered in Farum, Denmark. Recently, they have begun producing performance supercharging systems for Audi, BMW, and Porsche.

Kleemann's slogan is "Comfort Power," referring to its low-boost, high-output engines that create substantially more power than standard Mercedes models. Kleemann vehicles also include structural and mechanical integrity improvements often lacking in tuned sports cars. Its corporate logo is an abstract arrow which some corporate representatives refer to as the Kleemann carrot.

Any vehicle on the Mercedes lineup can be tuned in a number of ways from SLK roadsters to G-Class Wagons. Customers can specify custom seats, floormats, and interior fabrics as well as carbon fiber body kits, carbon front and rear splitters, and carbon interior panelling. Customers can order simple ECU upgrades that change transmission shift times and valve timing, or they can more aggressively have the engine bored and supercharged, install camshafts and high-flow headers. Kleemann also manufactures its own racing wheels, racing LSDs, racing suspension components, and multi-piston brakes. Kleemann can even install Lamborghini-style vertical doors on their modified vehicles.

History
Kleemann was founded in 1985 near Copenhagen. Initially it was a two-man operation, but took on a third partner in 1994. Kleemann began marketing its supercharger performance systems in 1988.

Records
In 2002 Danish race driver Jason Watt drove 338 km/h (210 mph) in a 607 hp (446 kW) Kleemann E 55K (W210 model) making it the world's fastest four-door car. Less than a year later a Kleemann tuned ML 55K clocked a remarkable 282 km/h (175 mph) on the Nardò Ring in southern Italy making it the world's fastest SUV. However, both records have since been broken by Brabus in Bottrop, Germany.

Innovations
Kleemann is credited with being the first company to combine a supercharger, intake manifold, and an intercooler into one single unit atop the engine block known as the Kleemann Kompressor. This is markedly different from the "Kompressors" or superchargers found on Mercedes-AMG vehicles, although AMG has since begun manufacturing only twin-turbo engines. Kleemann also utilizes twin-screw superchargers instead of roots type superchargers of conventionally belt-driven boost systems.

Vehicles
Kleemann E 55K 
Kleemann ML 55K 
Kleemann CL 60
Kleemann E5KCC
Kleemann SLK 55k S8

References

External links
Kleemann Main Page

Mercedes-Benz
Auto parts suppliers of Denmark
Automotive motorsports and performance companies
Auto tuning companies
Danish brands